Nellie Stewart, born Eleanor Stewart Towzey (20 November 1858 – 21 June 1931) was an Australian actress and singer, known as "Our Nell" and "Sweet Nell".

Born into a theatrical family, Stewart began acting as a child. As a young woman, she built a career playing in operetta and Gilbert and Sullivan operas. In the mid-1880s, she began a long relationship with the theatrical manager George Musgrove. In the 1890s, Stewart had fewer successful roles. Overwork had taken a toll on her voice, and she took several years off from performing, giving birth to a daughter with Musgrove.

In 1902, Stewart had one of her greatest successes in the title role in Sweet Nell of Old Drury, and found another success at the end of the decade in Sweet Kitty Bellairs. After this, she continued to perform in both comedy and drama, and worked in theatre management, through the 1920s.

Life and career

Stewart was born in Woolloomooloo, Sydney on 20 November 1858. Her father, Richard Stewart, was an actor and singer who, in 1857, married the actress "Mrs. Guerin", née Theodosia Yates, a great-granddaughter of the actors Richard Yates and Mary Ann Yates. Nellie's mother came to Australia in 1840 and took leading parts in opera, such as the title role in Maritana when the opera was first produced at Sydney. Her two daughters by James Guerin became known on the Australian stage as Docy (for Theodosia) and Maggie (for Margaret) Stewart. Theatre was thus in Nellie Stewart's blood, but she was brought up strictly. The family moved to Melbourne where Nellie first attended the old model school and afterwards, for a time, a boarding-school. She was taught fencing by her father, dancing by Henry Leopold and, later on, singing by David Miranda, father of Lalla Miranda.

Early career
At about five years of age, Stewart played a juvenile role with Charles Kean in The Stranger, and as the years went on took children's parts in pantomime. In 1877, she sang and danced through seven parts in a family production called Rainbow Revels, and in 1878 she played Ralph Rackstraw in an early production in Melbourne of H.M.S. Pinafore. In the following year she was a member of her father's company which toured India, and then went on to the United States to play a small town tour.

Towards the end of 1880, she received an offer to play the principal boy in Sinbad the Sailor at Melbourne, which she accepted, and the pantomime had great success, running for 14 weeks and earning Stewart some recognition. In 1881 she was Griolet in La fille du tambour-major and the Countess in Olivette. During the next 13 years, Stuart was to take leading parts in 35 comic operas, including those of Gilbert and Sullivan. In December 1883, for example, she played the title role in Patience. As principal boy in the following Christmas pantomime, Stewart was careless when climbing the beanstalk, fell and broke her arm, had it set in the theatre, and completed the part. Forty years later, she recorded that her understudies seldom had an opportunity to appear.

 
On 26 January 1884, Stewart married Richard Goldsbrough Row – "a girl's mad act" she called it in later years, for she discovered at once that she did not really care for her husband. They parted within a few weeks, and Stewart resumed her theatrical work. Among her principal parts in the next three years were Mabel in The Pirates of Penzance, Phyllis in Iolanthe, Yum-Yum in The Mikado, the title role in Princess Ida and Clairette in La fille de Madame Angot. She was a great favourite with the public, but her immense vitality led to restlessness and mannerisms which were commented on by the more intelligent of her critics, whom she afterwards thanked in her autobiography. About this time she formed an association with the well-known theatrical manager, George Musgrove, which lasted until his death. She had an unbounded affection and admiration for him, and he was the "great and good man" to whose memory she dedicated her autobiography My Life Story.

In 1887 she retired from the stage for 12 months and went to London with Musgrove, returning to Australia in January 1888 to play in Dorothy, with the composer, Alfred Cellier, conducting. In March 1888 she sang Marguerite in Charles Gounod's Faust at Melbourne for 24 consecutive nights, an extraordinary feat, but it was probably the beginning of the overstraining of her voice, which some years later she was to lose altogether. In April 1888 she played Elsie in The Yeoman of the Guard, at a salary of £15 a week, her highest salary up to that time.

In 1889 she played for a successful season in Paul Jones. She then went to London and played Susan in the unsuccessful Blue-eyed Susan, a burlesque written by George Robert Sims. The play was not a good one, and Stewart had difficulty overcoming her nervousness in London, seldom singing her best there. She felt depressed and later wrote that she was unable to give her natural vivacity full play. She retired for two additional years, during which time she gave birth to a daughter, Nancye Doris Stewart (1893–1973), the child of her lover Musgrove, before returning to Australia. In September 1893, Stewart began playing a repertoire of nine operas including Gianetta in The Gondoliers and the title role in La Cigale. During the next two years, the principal parts in Ma mie Rosette and Mam'zelle Nitouche were among Stewart's successes.

Later career
In 1895 she returned to London and, except for one small part in an unsuccessful play, did not appear on the stage for four years. During that period Musgrove had a great success in producing The Belle of New York with Edna May in the principal part. Stewart returned to the stage at Christmas 1899 as principal boy in the Theatre Royal, Drury Lane pantomime, The Forty Thieves. Her salary was £50 a week, and she felt a special pleasure in working in a theatre with the associations of Drury Lane. She was cast as principal boy in the following year, but became ill on the opening day and returned to Melbourne soon afterwards.

When the Duke and Duchess of York came to Australia to open the first federal parliament, Stewart sang the ode "Australia" at the beginning of the musical programme. In February 1902 she had one of the greatest parts in her career, Nell Gwynne in Sweet Nell of Old Drury. She became known as "Our Nell" and "Sweet Nell". Other comedy parts followed in Mice and Men and Zaza. It was in the last play that Stewart reached her largest salary, £80 a week.

In 1904 and 1905, Pretty Peggy and Camille were added to the repertoire. A visit to America followed and Sweet Nell proved a great success in San Francisco, California. It was intended to work over to New York, but the 1906 San Francisco earthquake compelled the company to abandon the tour, all the scenery for the repertoire season having been destroyed. Miss Stewart returned to Australia, but it was not until 1909 that she had another success in Sweet Kitty Bellairs, which was alternated with Zaza, Rosalind in As You Like It, and Sweet Nell, over a long season. In March 1910 she essayed a part in pure comedy, Maggie Wylie in What Every Woman Knows, in which the actress's own charm successfully grappled with the problem of playing the part of a woman supposed to have none. This was succeeded by Princess Mary in the costume play, When Knighthood was in Flower, and a successful performance of the title role in Trilby. She also made her sole film in 1911, reprising her stage success as the title character in Sweet Nell of Old Drury for director Raymond Longford.

A lean period followed and the effect of World War I on the theatres led to Stewart losing practically all her savings. She toured New Zealand in 1915, receiving warm critical reviews. In January 1916 she was deeply depressed by grief over the death of George Musgrove, until she was persuaded by Hugh Donald McIntosh to take up work again in a condensed version of Sweet Nell at the Tivoli Theatre. He also employed her to help in the production of the London hits Chu Chin Chow and The Lilac Domino. Later on she did similar work for J. C. Williamson Limited.

In 1923 Stewart published her autobiography, My Life's Story, an interesting record of her life. In later years she made occasional appearances for charities, on one occasion at over 60 years of age playing Romeo in the balcony scene from Romeo and Juliet to the Juliet of her daughter, Nancye. When nearly 70 years of age she played an astonishing revival of Sweet Nell of Old Drury, and took the emotional part of Cavallini in Romance in July 1930.

On 24 March 1931 by the Columbia Graphophone Company recorded Stewart and others performing extracts from Sweet Nell and the monologue "Nellie Stewart Addresses Her Public". Two months after Stewart's death, in August 1931,Columbia presented the  Mitchell Library, in whose collection they now reside, with engraved silver canisters containing the original recordings.

Summary
Stewart held a place by herself on the Australian stage. Beautiful in face and figure, full of vivacity, a natural actress, she had also an excellent soprano voice which she lost in middle life probably from over-working it. She took her art seriously, lived carefully and never lost her figure. She had unusual success at playing "younger" parts late in life. She had great versatility, and after being for many years at the head of her profession in Australia in light opera, she was able, after the loss of her voice, to take leading parts in non-musical comedy and drama. Though not judged a great actress, she was an effective one in both emotional and comic parts. Her autobiography displays a woman of charming character, kindly, appreciative of the good work of others, and free from the petty jealousies often associated with stage life. She had the admiration, affection and respect of Australian playgoers, both men and women, for 50 years.

Death
Stewart died, aged 72, on 21 June 1931 at her residence, "Den o' Gwynne", Thompson Street, Mosman, New South Wales. Her illness was reported as short and the result of heart trouble and pleurisy. Crowds gathered in Sydney for her funeral on 24 June 1931. People lined the streets and thronged around St. James' Church, where the first of a number of services was held. Stewart's remains were cremated at Rookwood Necropolis in Sydney after another service, and her ashes were taken to Melbourne. After a further series of services attended by more crowds, her ashes were placed in the family grave at Boroondara General Cemetery in suburban Kew on 27 June 1931. She was survived by her daughter, Nancye.

Recognition
"Nellie Stewart bangles" became a popular fashion accessory for young Australian and New Zealand women in the late 19th and early 20th centuries. Usually worn on the upper arm, they were an emulation of Nellie Stewart's style. In 1886, as a token of thanks for her support of a fund to commemorate the death of General Gordon of Khartoum, Stewart was presented with 25 gold sovereigns. She had them made into a simple bangle which she wore on her upper arm for the rest of her life. Jewellers, such as Angus and Coote, marketed the bangles.

In 1930, a portrait of Stewart was painted by W. B. McInnes. It is in the collection of the National Gallery of Victoria, Melbourne. From 1933, the "Nellie Stewart Memorial Cup" was given as a prize in Junior Theatre League drama contests for the best performance of an Australian-written play. In 1934, "Nellie Stewart Memorial committee" was formed to benefit Sydney hospital, which was supported by Nellie Stewart in her lifetime, and also raised funds for a monument to Stewart. In 1936, a rose garden was established and named the "Nellie Stewart Garden of Memory" at the Botanic Gardens, Sydney. A sandstone and bas relief memorial to Stewart was placed there in 1938.

In 1989, a $1 postage stamp was issued by Australia Post honouring Stewart together with J. C. Williamson. In 2001, an exhibition at the Arts Centre, Melbourne, marked the 70th anniversary of Stewart's death.

References

Sources
 Power, Bryan (2004). "Australia's idol – Nellie Stewart" in the Rowville-Lysterfield History Project.
 
 Van Straten, Frank (2007). "Nellie Stewart 1858–1931", Live Performance Australia Hall of Fame website, retrieved 26 January 2014.
Moratti, Mel. "Nellie Stewart", Melbourne "Table Talk", 12 April 1889, the Gilbert and Sullivan Down Under website. A search for "Nellie Stewart" on this site reveals many details of her career.

Further reading
 Stewart, Nellie (1923). My life's story, Sydney: John Sands.

External links

 Biography by Ailsa Craig from Australia Album – The Past in Pictures
 Nellie Stewart Collection in the Performing Arts Collection, the Arts Centre, Melbourne (costumes, news clippings, photographs, programmes, record sleeves etc.)
A Nellie Stewart theatre poster at the State Library of Tasmania image collection.

1858 births
1931 deaths
Australian stage actresses
Australian child actresses
Australian operatic sopranos
19th-century Australian actresses
Actresses from Sydney
19th-century Australian women singers
20th-century Australian women singers
Musicians from Sydney